The 1966 Atlantic Coast Conference men's basketball tournament was held in Raleigh, North Carolina, at Reynolds Coliseum from March 3–5, 1966. Duke defeated , 71–66, to win the championship for the fourth time. Steve Vacendak of Duke was named tournament MVP. This was the last ACC Tournament held at Reynolds Coliseum.

Duke defeated all three of their in-state rivals on their way to the tournament championship, beating Wake Forest in the quarterfinal round, North Carolina in the semifinal, and NC State in the championship game.

Bracket

Tournament
ACC men's basketball tournament
College basketball tournaments in North Carolina
Basketball competitions in Raleigh, North Carolina
ACC men's basketball tournament
20th century in Raleigh, North Carolina